Cover Boy may refer to:
Cover Boy, 2006 Italian film
Cover Boy (EP), 2014 extended play by Matt Fishel
James Charles (Internet personality), first male model for CoverGirl sometimes known as "cover boy"
A man whose photograph features on the front cover of a magazine; see Cover girl